Pingshan District is a district under the administration of the city of Benxi, Liaoning province, People's Republic of China.

Administrative divisions
There are eight subdistricts and one town in the district.

Subdistricts:
Dongming Subdistrict, Pingshan Subdistrict, Cuidong Subdistrict, Zhanqian Subdistrict, Gongren Subdistrict, Qianjin Subdistrict, Nandi Subdistrict, Beitai Subdistrict

The only town is Qiaotou

References

External links
Pingshan District Government website 

County-level divisions of Liaoning
Benxi